Midnattssol is a Swedish-French police procedural series which aired for one season on Sveriges Television on 2016. As Midnight Sun, the series debuted on Australia's SBS on January 12, 2017. Anders Harnesk (Gustaf Hammarsten) and Kahina Zadi (Leïla Bekhti) are the two main protagonists. The pair investigate the death of a French national in far north Sweden, near Kiruna. It is the first in a series of mysterious, ritualistic killings. The town center is being moved as their biggest employer, an iron mining company, has worked from underneath.

Cast 
She travels to Kiruna on secondment for a Frenchman's murder. She was raised in Marseille, but left home at age 15. She has led both local and international violent cases. Her family is from Algeria, and Kahina has a troubled past which is gradually revealed.
 Gustaf Hammarsten as Anders Harnesk, Luleå deputy police prosecutor of mixed Swedish-Sámi ethnic descent. He is divorced and shares custody of their daughter, Jessika. Unbeknownst to his family, he is lovers with Thor, a male pilot.
 Richard Ulfsäter as Thor, a helicopter pilot who assists police investigations, Anders' domestic partner.
 Jessica Grabowsky as Jenny-Ann, a geologist at the mining company. She is heavily pregnant and is disturbed to find that not all of the town's center had to be moved.
 Peter Stormare as Rutger Burlin, the Luleå chief prosecution officer, who dies mysteriously while investigating the initial murders, which leaves Anders in charge.
 Göran Forsmark as Sparen Andersson, the town drunk, berry picker and hermit-fisherman. His son, Johan, was brutally drowned in front of him, ten years earlier.
 Albin Grenholm as Kimmo Rauta, Jenny-Ann's husband, a mining foreman, and Sparen's friend.
 Jakob Hultcrantz Hansson as Thorndahl, a local police sergeant. Often reminds Anders of procedural matters.
 Karolina Furberg as Jessika Harnesk, Anders' daughter, staying with him for a month.
 Jeremy Corallo as Nadji, Kahina's long estranged son, who is raised by her mother as her own younger brother. He goes to Paris, and then on to Kiruna, to find out why she left him.

Episodes

References

External links

2016 Swedish television series debuts
2016 Swedish television series endings